Haberli is a village in the İdil District of Şırnak Province in Turkey. The village is populated by Assyrians and had a population of 179 in 2021.

Information 
Haberli is an Assyrian Syriac Orthodox village of thirty clans who historically was under the patronage of Kurds of the Salihan tribe. Most of the population migrated to Germany after Sayfo and only 25 households remained by 2016. Some families consider themselves members of the Salihan tribe.

There were 900 speakers of Turoyo in the village in 1984.

References 

Villages in İdil District
Assyrian communities in Turkey